The Bass Highway is a highway in Tasmania, Australia.  It connects the three cities across the north of the state – Burnie, Devonport and Launceston. The road was named due to its proximity to the Bass Strait. It is a part of the National Highway, designated as National Highway 1, together with the Midland and Brooker highways in Tasmania.

The highway passes through or near the following localities:

Launceston
 Prospect and other Launceston suburbs
 Hadspen
 Carrick
 Hagley
 Westbury
 Exton
Deloraine
 Elizabeth Town
 Sassafras
 Latrobe
Devonport
 Forth
 Ulverstone
 Penguin
Burnie

From here, the highway ceases to be part of the National Highway, but continues as the Bass Highway (A2) through the following towns:

 Somerset
 Wynyard
 Smithton
 Marrawah

Upgrades
The name "Bass Highway" was in use by 1938. Since the mid-1970s the highway has undergone significant upgrades that have included bypasses and deviations, duplications and grade separations, particularly between Burnie and Launceston. 
On 30 March 1977, ‘stage A’ of the ‘Burnie Highway System’ was opened to traffic. This stage connected the Bass Highway east of the town with Alexander Street by an elevated roadway over the port access road and rail lines. Shortly after, on 19 April 1977, the bypass of Devonport was completed with the opening of the final section between Middle Road, Devonport and Don, referred to in that year's Main Roads Annual Report as the ‘Devonport to Don Freeway’. This section was an extension of the earlier Victoria Bridge project.
Three years later, the Ulverstone bypass was completed and opened to traffic in August 1980.
The duplication of the highway from Wivenhoe, east of Burnie, to Chasm Creek was completed during the 1983–84 financial year, and was followed in May 1984 with the opening of 500 metres of ‘stage B' of the Burnie Highway System. This section duplicated the highway along North Terrace. In September 1986, all four lanes over the complete length of ‘stage B’ of the ‘Burnie Expressway’ (‘Burnie Highway System’) were brought into operation.
Throughout 1986 and 1987, sections of the highway were progressively duplicated and opened to traffic between Don (Devonport) and the Forth River, with the last section completed in June 1987. This was followed by completion of duplication between Forth River and Ulverstone in late 1987.
In 1988, at the eastern terminus of the Bass Highway, a new alignment was opened to connect directly to the then new Launceston Southern Outlet, which itself had opened to traffic in 1985. Known as the Prospect bypass, this alignment was opened to traffic on 23 January 1988. 
West of Burnie, the Smithton bypass was opened to traffic in May 1988.
The Deloraine Bypass was opened on 8 June 1990. The project was carried out over five years and cost a total of A$19 million. The bypass opening was performed by the Federal and State ministers for Land Transport and Roads and Transport respectively.

Other bypasses have included Carrick and Hadspen in the late 1980s and the longest stretch of highway, the Hagley-Westbury bypass, which was completed in 2001. The 'old' highway alignment between Deloraine and Hadspen is now known as Meander Valley Road, and is promoted as a tourist route.

The Bass Highway is, like Bass Strait, named for explorer George Bass.

Major intersections

See also

 Highways in Australia
 List of highways in Tasmania

References

Highways in Tasmania
Northern Tasmania